A comma is a type of  punctuation mark.

Arts, entertainment, and media

Music
 
 Comma (music), a type of interval in music theory
 Comma (rhetoric), a short clause in Ancient Greek rhetoric
 "Commas" (song), the censored version of the Future song "Fuck Up Some Commas"
 Comma, an atmospheric metal album by April Weeps

Other arts, entertainment, and media
 Comma, the journal of the International Council on Archives
 Comma Press, a British publisher

Other uses
 Comma (butterfly), the brush-footed butterfly Polygonia c-album
 Comma operator, an operator in C and other related programming languages
 Johannine Comma, 1 John 5:7-8
 Oxford comma (also known as Harvard comma, serial comma, or series comma), a disputed usage of the punctuation mark

See also 
 Caesura
 Coma (disambiguation)
 Commer
 Kama